Daryl Kramp (born June 14, 1947) is a Canadian politician.  He served as the Conservative member of the Member of Parliament for the riding of Prince Edward—Hastings. He also served as the Progressive Conservative Member of Provincial Parliament for the riding of Hastings—Lennox and Addington.

Personal life
Kramp is a former investigator with the Ontario Provincial Police.  He has been a municipal councillor and deputy reeve in the municipality of Madoc, Ontario where he currently lives.  He works in the retail, wholesale and hospitality sectors.  He has also organized junior-level ice hockey tours, and is a part-time instructor at St. Lawrence College, Kingston.

Federal politics
Kramp lost two federal election bids before his victory in 2004.  In the 1997 election, he ran as a Progressive Conservative in the riding of Hastings—Frontenac—Lennox and Addington, finishing second against Liberal Larry McCormick. He ran in the same riding for the 2000 election, and this time finished third against McCormick and Canadian Alliance candidate Sean McAdam.

The Canadian Alliance and Progressive Conservatives merged in 2003 as the Conservative Party of Canada. In the 2004 election, Kramp ran as a Conservative in Prince Edward—Hastings, and narrowly defeated Liberal Bruce Knutson.  The seat was previously held by Liberal cabinet minister Lyle Vanclief, who was not seeking re-election. He was re-elected in 2006 by a much larger margin.

Kramp described himself as a Red Tory, although his voting record was in line with the party's direction.

Kramp was a member of the Canada-China Legislative Association (CCLA) which provides a forum for discussing bilateral and multilateral issues facing both Canada and China.

He was unseated by Mike Bossio in 2015, when he decided to run in the new riding of Hastings—Lennox and Addington which contains part of his old riding, the Hastings County.

Provincial politics
On October 3, 2016, Kramp announced he would be seeking the Ontario Progressive Conservative nomination in the newly created provincial riding of Hastings-Lennox and Addington. On November 26, Kramp won the nomination.

On June 7, 2018, Kramp was elected to the Legislative Assembly of Ontario.

In the 2021 Canadian federal election, Kramp's daughter Shelby won the Conservative nomination and federal election in Hastings-Lennox-Addington, the same riding Kramp ran in 2015.

Electoral record

References

External links
 

Members of the House of Commons of Canada from Ontario
Conservative Party of Canada MPs
1947 births
Living people
People from Hastings County
People from Kirkland Lake
21st-century Canadian politicians
Progressive Conservative Party of Ontario MPPs